The Stamp Specialist is the title of a series of books on philatelic research written and edited for the advanced collector of postage stamps.

Publisher
The books were published by H. L. Lindquist, 2 West 46 Street, New York City.

Format
Twenty books were issued between 1939 and 1948. Early books were paper bound, but the majority was hard-bound and each later book was usually popularly identified by the color of its hard cover.

Content 
Each book contains six or more studies of research by eminent philatelic experts, each related to a particular detailed philatelic subject.

Article title and authors of the articles:

Volume 1, part 1 (1939)
 Miscellany - George B. Sloane
 Mounting and Filing Entire Covers and Postal Stationery - A. Eugene Michel
 Color - A. Maerz
 The United States Five Cent Stamp of 1847 - Stanley B. Ashbrook
 Post Office Seals - Prescott Holden Thorp
 The Confederate States of America 1863 Ten Cent Blue - Stanley B. Ashbrook
 Guam Guard Mail - H. F. Bowker
 The Development of the Rotary Press Printing - Max G. Johl
 Unusual Methods of Mounting - Paul F. Berdanier, Jr. and others
 American and European Methods of Specializing - Edwin Mueller
 Philatelic Auction Survey  
 An Analysis of Prices Realized for U.S. Stamps Over a Period of Fifty Years - Charles J. Phillips

Volume 1, part 2 (1939)
 Independent Mail Routes of the United States - Harry M. Konwiser & Laurence B. Mason
 A Study of the Major Varieties of the U.S. 3c 1851 - Richard McP. Cabeen
 Roman States - The Original and Counterfeits of the First Issue - Fritz Billig
 Pages of Aristocrats from My Stamp Album - Philip H. Ward, Jr.
 The "Used Abroads" of Great Britain - Lou W. Kreicker & Major H.P. Burrell
 The Australian Pennies of the King George V Issue - Wm. J. Davy
 New York Post Office, Some Early "Steamship" Markings - Stanley B. Ashbrook
 The "Southn. Letter Unpaid" Marking of Louisville, Ky. June and July 1861 - Lawrence L. Schenfield
 Preliminary Report on the Survey on Condition - 
 Airmail Stamps at Auction, An Analysis of American and English Prices Realized During the Past Year
 What Chance Has the Mail Bidder at a Stamp Auction and Other Pertinent Data

Volume 1, Part 3 (1940)
 The Penny Black, Philately's Number One - includes an oversize engraving of a Penny Black - Lou W. Kreicker & Major H.P. Burrell
 The United States 12c-24c-30c and 90c Imperforates of 1860 - Stanley B. Ashbrook
 United States Postal History - Part 1 - Seymour Dunbar
 Philately Honors the Constitution - C. N. Downs
 Steamboat Mail Transportation on the Great Lakes - The Ward Steamship Lines - W. L. Babcock, M.D.
 C.C.C. "Socked on the Nose" - Theodore E. Steinway
 Unusual Methods of Mounting 
 Revised report on the Survey on Condition
 How to Distinguish Stamp Varieties - Edwin Mueller

Number 4 (1940)
 Paper. A Non-technical History and Description of the More Common Types as used in Philately - James H. Obrig
 Aviation and Philately, based on the Norman Serphos Collection - Frank L. Wilson
 United States Postal History (Part 2) - Seymour Dunbar
 The Three Cent 1857 - What to look for in the Perforated Issue - Richard McP. Cabeen
 The First Stamps of Honduras - Bertram W. H. Poole
 40 Years of United States Special Delivery Stamps - C. W. Bates
 Methods of Mounting - Paul F. Berdanier, Jr.
 Final Report on the Survey on Condition
 INCLUDED WITH BOOK #4 PAPER SAMPLES: 
  - "SUPPLEMENT TO THE STAMP SPECIALIST Number 4 (1940) - A glassine packet of nine enclosed paper samples to be mounted with stamp hinges or pasted, in the spaces allocated to them on the pages.
 The spaces for the paper samples to be mounted are within the article, " Paper. A Non-technical History and Description of the More Common Types as used in Philately - James H. Obrig

Orange (1941)
 Designs for United States stamps – Paul F. Berdanier, Jr.
 The Supplementary Mail Service of the New York Post office 1853-1872 – Stanley B. Ashbrook with comments by Dr. W. L. Babcock
 Poland – the stampless period – Stephen G. Rich and Vincent Domanski, Jr.
 The Luff reference collection – H. L. Lindquist
 The engraver of the Five Cents De La Rue – August Dietz
 Specializing in twentieth century United States stamps – Max G. Johl

Blue (1941)
 Thru the Newbury deluxe collection of the 19th century United States - Stanley B. Ashbrook
 Jammu and Kashmir – Notes on Their Stamps - Winthrop S. Boggs
 United States postal history - Seymour Dunbar
 A Canal Boat letter group
 A World’s Fair group
 A Railway Post Office group
 A Primer of the first Greek postage stamps - Robert O. Truman
 The capped relief of the Two Cents 1890 - John H. Latta, C.P.A.
 “Neither rain – nor snow – nor gloom of war...” Three letters that crossed the lines in the American Civil War - Lawerence L. Shenfield
 Poland, the period of stamps, to 1870 - Vincent Domanski Jr. & Stephen G. Rich

Yellow (1942)
 The Five Cent of 1847 Double Transfers - Stanley B. Ashbrook
 Prisoner of War and Flag-of-Truce Covers - Lawerence L. Shenfield
 Supplement to Independent Mail Routes of the United States - Harry M. Konwiser
 United States Postal History   
 Postal Memorials of Human Slavery and Lincoln - Seymour H. Dunbar
 The Autaugaville Alabama Stamps - Howard Lehman
 Countries for the Specialist  
 Norway  - H. L. Lindquist
 France  - Dr. A. J. C. Vaurie
 Great Britain  - Major H.P. Burrell
 Finland  - Arthur Linz
 Canada  - Walter Pollock
 Guatemala - H. L. Lindquist
 United States - The "Premieres Gravures" of 1861 - Stanley B. Ashbrook
 Census of Philatelists  
 How Many stamp collectors Are There

Red (1942)
 Canada-17c-1859, A Study of its Plate Positions - Senator James A. Calder
 Four Historical Covers from the Spanish–American War Period in Puerto - R. B. Preston
 China - James Starr
 Coffee House and Newsroom Mail.  The Origin of the Postal System in America - Abe Schoenfeld
 A Great Historic Document Comes to Light - General Winfield Scott's Proclamation to the People of Mexico 
 The Puerto Rican Columbian Commemorative Stamp of 1893 - R. B. Preston
 Confederate Notes  - Stanley B. Ashbrook
 Newly Discovered Prisoner of war cover with "Examined - Ship Island" in red  
 "Raleigh N. C. Paid 5" Postmaster Provisional or Handstamped Paid?
 Philatelic Byways thru 19th Century B.N.A. - Ed Richardson
 British Columbia and Vancouver's Island  
 New Brunswick  
 Nova Scotia  
 Prince Edward Island
 Countries for the Specialist  
 Ecuador - H. L. Lindquist
 Confederate Blockade Covers including some Unusual Examples - Van Dyk MacBride
 "Forwarded By" Handstamps - Harry M. Konwiser

Green (1943)
 The Trans-Mississippi Issue of 1898 (The So-Called Omaha Issue) - George B. Sloane
 The Bull's Eyes of Brazil (in Celebration of the Hundredth Anniversary) - H. L. Lindquist
 Unusual Aguinaldos in One of the Most Theatrical and Interesting Interludes in the History of the Philippine Islands - Col. Hans Lagerloef
 Guadeloupe, The Emerald Island - Robert G. Stone
 Confederate Stamps-On-Provisional Covers - Van Dyk MacBride
 Siam-Thailand - Adolph Klingenstein
 Egypt - Ernest A. Kehr
 Embossed Revenue Stamped Paper of the United States - Carl E. Dorr
 The Swastika in Philately - William T. Corbusier

Brown (1943)
 The 30 Cents Black Imperforate of 1860 - R. J. Mechin
 Confederate Notes - Lawrence L. Shenfield
 How the Fighting Men of the 5th Texas Regiment C.S.A. got their letters across the Mississippi to Texas 
 Southern Express Company Office Marking of Vicksburg, Mississippi
 The Democracy of Philately - The Rev'd. William H. Tower
 Canada 17c-1859. The Identification of its Printings through the use of Comparative Color Charts - Senator James A. Calder
 Puerto Rico - The 1873-1876 Overprinted Issues - R. B. Preston
 Russia - The Small Head U.S.S.R. Types of 1923-1927 - H. L. Aronson
 The Raleigh N.C. Provisional - A Correction - Stanley B. Ashbrook
 A Study of the Color of 1861, 3c U.S. Design Stamp - Wm. H. Beck

Gray (1943)
 The 6 Cents Lincoln Bank Note Issue - George C. Hahn
 A Sheaf of War Covers - The Rev'd. William H. Tower
 Canadian Patriotics and Related Boer War Covers - Ed. Richardson
 An Important Discovery on the United States 1898 4c Stamp - Ferrars Tows
 Early Foreign Mail Service From Peru - Arthur Linz
 History of the Bureau of Engraving and Printing - Thomas F. Morris
 Confederate Mexico Covers - A sequel to "Confederate Blockade Covers" - Van Dyk MacBride
 Iceland - Joseph Jaeger

Maroon (1944) 
 The South's "Way of Life" - Random Notes for the Student of Confederates - August Dietz
 The "Large Geneva Eagle" 1846-1848 - Gustave A. von Gross
 Southern Censorship of the South Bound Mail - L. G. Brookman
 Puerto Rico - The British Postal Agencies in Puerto Rico - R. B. Preston
 A Primer of English Postal History to the Adhesive Period - The Rev'd. William H. Tower
 The Maryland State Issue of 1818 of Revenue Stamped Paper - Colin MacR. Makepeace
 Philatelic Byways Thru 19th Century BNA-Victorian Canada - Ed Richardson
 Captain Absalom Grimes - The Confederate Mail Carrier - Van Dyk MacBride
 The Postal History of the Ionian Islands - Colonel Hans Lagerloef

White (1944)
 The City Delivery Letter Expresses of San Francisco - Ernest A. Wiltsee
 Air Mail Interruption Covers - R. Lee Black
 National Defense Issue - George C. Hahn and Sol Glass
  "Pan. & San Fran. S.S." (Panama and San Francisco Steam Ship) - Stanley B. Ashbrook
 Puerto Rico - Postal Markings of the 1855-1873 Period - R. B. Preston and M. H. Sanborn
 United States Savings Stamps -  A New Field for the Specialist - H. L. Lindquist
 The Royal Genealogies in Stamps - Harold F. Round

Black (1945)
 Barnard’s Caribou Express – in the Colony of British Columbia, 1860-1971 and later expresses of F. J. Barnard - Henry C. Hitt and Gerald E. Wellborn
 Some notes on the Harold C. Brooks collection of Confederate States of America - Stanley B. Ashbrook
 Patriotic cover fishing - Rollin E. Flower
 A huge find of rare western franks – many hitherto unknown varieties - Ernest A Wiltsee
 Insurance cancellations on Civil War revenues 1862-1871 - Jere. Hess Barr
 Don’t ignore the letters – a cover collector points out the interest and romance to be found in the contents of your covers - Towner K. Webster, Jr.
 A letter from Libby Prison - Van Dyk MacBride
 “Canada Mourns Her Beloved Queen” - Ed Richardson
 Syndicate envelopes - Thomas D. Perry

Coral (1945)
 The Overrun Nations series - Sol Glass
 Poland, the postal stationery - Clement A. Pulaski
 The Early Postal History of Peru - Arthur Linz
 Russian Zemstvos, a compendium of existing information with additional information based on original research - Col. Hans Lagerloef
 Norway, a few notes on the unlisted 1882-3 Issue - Gustave Larson
 Philadelphia’s part in the Civil War - George N. Malpass
 Brazilian postal forgeries - Samuel Ray

Emerald (1946)
 Confederate States of America  - Stanley B. Ashbrook
 Some Notes on the Postal Legislation  
 Postal Rates  
 Postal Uses and Earliest Known Dates of the Stamps of the General Issues
 Trans-Atlantic Mails - Major F. W. Staff
 Austria and Lombardy-Venetia, The Re-Engravings on the Dotted Background of the First Issue - Felix Brunner
 Puerto Rico  - R. B. Preston
 The Bogus Stamps of 1897  
 Revenue Stamps used for Postage
 The Development of The Electric Eye - Nathan Goldstein II
 Poland  - Clement A. Pulaski
 The Postal Stationery  
 Stamped Envelope  
 Letter Card

India (1946)
 The Autographed Field Letters of General Robert E. Lee - Van Dyk MacBride
 Lee Envelopes in the Congressional Library, Washington, D.C. - 
 Stamp Booklets and Booklet Panes - Sidney S. Jalkut
 Stamp Booklets and Booklet Panes of the World (the first known comprehensive compilation of these items ever made) - Sidney S. Jalkut
 1860-1863 Three Cents Plus One Cent Plus One Cent - Stanley B. Ashbrook
 Belgium Postal Savings and Roulette Cancellations - Lt. Com'd'r. Ray E. Morrison
 Norway - A Century of Steamship Mail Service - Gustav Larson
 Milwaukee Handstamps and Their Use - Kenneth F. Olson

Mahogany (1947) 
 Burdell's Express - J. R. W. Purves, F.R.P.S.L
 Express Company Labels of the United States - Harry M. Konwiser
 Stamp Booklets and Booklet Panes - Sidney S. Jalkut
 United States Postal Agency, Shanghai, China - Harvey Bounds
 The Life of Christ on Postage Stamps - George A. Rowse
 Stamped Revenue Paper Issued by Province of Mass., Colony of New York, and by Gt. Britain for Use in America - Leland Powers
 The Postage Due Issues of Norway, A Translation - Gustav Larson
 Camp Shenandoah, Va. - Van Dyk MacBride
 Some Comments on the U.S. Playing Card Stamps - John C. Rogers, Ph.D., M.D.
 The British Postal Service from Peru - Arthur Linz

Chartreuse (1948)
 Dies of the Columbian stamped envelopes, commemoratives of 1893 - F. L. Ellis
 A check list of uncataloged envelopes bearing patriotic designs of southern sentiment - George N. Malpass
 Puerto Rico; the postmaster provisionals of 1898 - R. B. Preston
 The street car R. P. O. system - Earl D. Moore
 A discovery in 1860 issue of Peru: double transfers - Arthur Linz
 Eights - Frank W. Staff
 The overrun nations series, the flag stamps - Supplement to Article Appearing in The Stamp Specialist Coral Book - Sol Glass
 A sequel to the autographed field letters of General Robert E. Lee - Van Dyk MacBride
 Stamp booklets and booklet panes - Second Supplement to List of Booklets in India Book - (First Supplement, Mahogany Book)

Forest Green (1948) 
 Fairs, Exhibitions and Expositions and Their Souvenirs - Raymond March
 Canada 5d 1859 - Renumbering of Flaws - G. A. E. Chapman
 Guatemala, the 100 Varieties of the One Peso Lithographed Identified - H. L. Lindquist
 "Camp Shenandoah, Va." - Were There TWO? - Van Dyk MacBride
 Teaching With Stamps - Louis H. Drinkwine
 The Alfonso XII Issues for Puerto Rico - R. B. Preston
 The Penny Postage Jubilee of 1890 - Stephen G. Rich
 Stamp Booklets and Booklet Panes - Sydney S. Jalkut
 The Stamp Specialist Enters a New Phase 
 Index to the Stamp Specialist

See also
 H. L. Lindquist
 Philately
 Philatelic literature

References
 http://www.stampwhiz.com/stampspecialist.htm The Stamp Specialist
 http://www.omahaphilatelicsociety.org/Library/Library_List.pdf  Omaha Philatelic Library Listing

Philatelic literature